The structure of the United States Army is complex, and can be interpreted in several different ways: active/reserve, operational/administrative, and branches/functional areas.

From time to time the Department of the Army issues Department of the Army General Orders. In addition to base closures, unit citations, certain awards such as the Medal of Honor and Legion of Merit, they may concern the creation of JROTC units and structural changes to the Army.  These are listed by year on the Army Publishing Directorate's website.

This page aims to portray the current overall structure of the US Army.

History

Prior to 1903, members of the National Guard were considered state soldiers unless federalized by the President. Since the Militia Act of 1903, all National Guard soldiers have held dual status: as National Guardsmen under the authority of the governors of their states and as a reserve of the U.S. Army under the authority of the President.
Since the adoption of the total force policy, in the aftermath of the Vietnam War, reserve component soldiers have taken a more active role in U.S. military operations. Reserve and Guard units took part in the Gulf War, peacekeeping in Kosovo, and the 2003 invasion of Iraq.

Although the present-day Army exists as an all-volunteer force, augmented by Reserve and National Guard forces, measures exist for emergency expansion in the event of a catastrophic occurrence, such as a large scale attack against the U.S. or the outbreak of a major global war.

The final stage of Army mobilization, known as "activation of the unorganized militia" would effectively place all able-bodied males in the service of the U.S. Army.

During World War I, the "National Army" was organized to fight the conflict. It was demobilized at the end of World War I.

After World War I, former units were replaced by the Regular Army, the Organized Reserve Corps, and the State Militias. In the 1920s and 1930s, the "career" soldiers were known as the "Regular Army" with the "Enlisted Reserve Corps" and "Officer Reserve Corps" augmented to fill vacancies when needed.

In 1941, the "Army of the United States" was founded to fight World War II. The Regular Army, Army of the United States, the National Guard, and Officer/Enlisted Reserve Corps (ORC and ERC) existed simultaneously.

Post World War II
After World War II, the ORC and ERC were combined into the United States Army Reserve. The Army of the United States was re-established for the Korean War and Vietnam War and was demobilized upon the suspension of the Draft.

Active and reserve components
The United States Army is made up of three components: one active—the Regular Army; and two reserve components—the Army National Guard and the Army Reserve. Both reserve components are primarily composed of part-time soldiers who train once a month, known as Battle Assembly, Unit Training Assemblies (UTAs), or simply "drills", while typically conducting two to three weeks of annual training each year. Both the Regular Army and the Army Reserve are organized under Title 10 of the United States Code. The National Guard is organized under Title 32. While the Army National Guard is organized, trained, and equipped as a component of the U.S. Army, individual units are under the command of individual states' governors. However, units of the National Guard can be federalized by presidential order and against the governor's wishes.

Administrative

Headquarters Department of the Army (HQ DA) Staff

The U.S. Army is led by a civilian Secretary of the Army, who reports to the secretary of defense, and serves as civilian oversight for the Chief of Staff of the United States Army (CSA). The CSA is assisted by the Vice Chief of Staff of the United States Army. The CSA is a member of the Joint Chiefs of Staff, a body composed of the service chiefs from each service who advise the President of the United States and secretary of defense on military matters under the guidance of the chairman and vice chairman of the Joint Chiefs of Staff.

Field Operating Agencies
 Assistant Secretary of the Army for Financial Management and Comptroller (ASA (FM&C))
 Cost and Economic Analysis Agency, MD
 Finance Command, VA
 Assistant Secretary of the Army for Manpower & Reserve Affairs (ASA (M&RA))
EEO Agency, DC
EEO Compliance and Complaints Review Agency, VA
Army Enterprise Marketing Office, IL
 Assistant Secretary of the Army for Acquisition, Logistics, and Technology (ASA(ALT))
Army Contracting Agency (ACA)
 Office of the Auditor General (SAAG)
United States Army Audit Agency, VA
 Office of the Chief of Public Affairs (OCPA)
Soldiers Media Center
 Office of the Chief of Staff of the Army (OCSA)
U.S. Army Test and Evaluation Management Agency, DC
Center of Military History, DC
U.S. Army Combat Readiness Center, Ala.
 Office of the Army G-8 (Financial Management)
Center for Army Analysis, VA
Office of the Army Chief Information Officer/G-6
Second Army
 Office of the Army G-4
Logistics Innovation Agency, VA
 Office of the Army G-3/5/7 (Operations/Plans)
Army War College, PA
Command and Control Support Agency, VA (not available)
U.S. Military Observers Group, DC (not available)
Office of the Deputy Chief of Staff, Intelligence (Army G-2)
United States Army Intelligence and Security Command (INSCOM)
Office of the Deputy Chief of Staff for Personnel (Army G-1)
 Army Human Resources Command
 Office of the Assistant Chief of Staff for Installation Management (ACSIM)
Installation Support Management Activity
 Office of the Judge Advocate General (OTJAG)
The Judge Advocate General's Legal Center and School (TJAGLCS)
U.S. Army Legal Support Agency (USALSA)
 Office of Special Trial Counsel (OSTC)

Office of the Inspector General
The Inspector General of the Army (IG) maintains open channels of communication for extraordinary issues which might lie outside the purview of the chain of command; it lists points of contact for the 3 Army Commands (ACOMs), the 11 Army Service Component Commands (ASCCs), and 12 Direct Reporting Units (DRUs). IG teams might then be assigned to a case, if need be, to perform inspections, assessments, and investigations.

 Inspector General's Corps

Army Commands, and Army Service Component Commands

Army Commands (ACOMs) and Army Service Component Commands (ASCCs) serve different purposes. The ACOMs are: Forces Command, Futures Command, Materiel Command, and Training and Doctrine Command.

Some of the Army Service Component Commands (ASCCs) are components of the six geographical Unified Combatant Commands (CCMDs). Other ASCCs serve the functional CCMDs.

 United States Army Central headquartered at Shaw Air Force Base, South Carolina
 United States Army North headquartered at Fort Sam Houston, Texas
 United States Army South headquartered at Fort Sam Houston, Texas
 United States Army Europe headquartered at Lucius D. Clay Kaserne, Wiesbaden, Germany
 United States Army Africa headquartered at Caserma Ederle, Vicenza, Italy
 United States Army Pacific headquartered at Fort Shafter, Hawaii.

Army Cyber Command is a component of United States Cyber Command. The commander of Army Cyber used to serve as commander of Second Army. Up until 2017, Second Army was a direct reporting unit to the Army CIO/G-6, with the CIO reporting to the Secretary of the Army, while the G-6 reports to the Army Chief of Staff. A 2017 reorganization eliminated the need for Second Army's network operations coordinating function, and the headquarters was inactivated on 31 March 2017. Army Network Enterprise Technology Command formerly reporting directly to the CIO/G-6, was a component of Second Army. The numerical designation 9th Army Signal Command has now been removed from NETCOM.

In addition, the Army's Special Operations Command administers its Joint Operations units; Space and Missile Defense Command provides global satellite-related infrastructure, and missile defense for the combatant commands, and for the nation. Surface Deployment and Distribution Command provides transport.

 Headquarters, United States Department of the Army (HQDA):

Source: U.S. Army organization

Operational unit structure

Most U.S. Army units can be operationally divided into the following components from largest to smallest:
 Field army: Formerly consisted of an army headquarters battalion, two corps, army troops (including army field artillery and army air defense artillery groups and brigades, an armored cavalry regiment, army aviation, military intelligence, combat engineer, and signal groups, and brigades), and a field army support command (FASCOM) consisting of military police, medical, and support (i.e., maintenance, quartermaster, and services) brigades, and transportation and ordnance groups. Now primarily an administrative arrangement, consisting of multiple corps. The last time a multiple-corps army took the field was Third Army directing VII and XVIII Corps during Operation Desert Storm. Armies now also operate as army service component commands (ASCCs) of unified combatant commands, such as Seventh Army/USAREUR. Armies have also effectively operated as military districts formerly in the continental United States. Fifth Army and First Army performed this function up until recently. Usually commanded by a general or lieutenant general.
 Corps: Formerly consisted of a corps headquarters and two or more divisions, corps troops (consisting of corps artillery, an armored cavalry regiment, an air defense artillery group, and an army aviation group), an expeditionary sustainment command (ESC) and other organic support brigades. A corps is now designated as an "operational unit of employment", that may command a flexible number of modular units. Usually commanded by a lieutenant general. 20,000–45,000 soldiers.
 Division: Formerly consisted of a division headquarters company, three maneuver brigades, division artillery (DIVARTY), sustainment brigade, an aviation brigade, an air defense artillery battalion, an armored cavalry squadron, and an engineer brigade, and other support assets. Until the brigade combat team program was developed, the division was the smallest self-sufficient level of organization in the U.S. Army. Current divisions are "tactical units of employment", and may command a flexible number of modular units, but generally will include three brigade combat teams and a combat aviation brigade, supported by a staff in a headquarters and headquarters battalion. Usually commanded by a major general who is supported by a command sergeant major. Typically consists of 17,000–21,000 soldiers but can grow up to 35,000–40,000 with attached support units.
 Brigade (or group): Composed of three battalions, with a brigadier general or a colonel as commander, supported by a staff in a headquarters and headquarters company. Maneuver brigades have transformed into brigade combat teams, generally consisting of three maneuver battalions, a cavalry squadron, a fires battalion, a special troops battalion (with engineers, signals, and military intelligence), and a command sergeant major and a support battalion. Stryker brigade combat teams have a somewhat larger structure. 3,000–5,000 soldiers.
 Regiment:  The Army, for the most part is no longer organized by regiments. Rather, battalions and squadrons maintain regimental affiliations in that they are called (for example), 1st Battalion, 8th Infantry (Regiment is implied) and is written 1–8 Inf. In this case, there is no regimental commander, and the battalion is organized as part of a brigade for combat. The exceptions are those units, such as armored cavalry regiments which remain organized, and fight, as a regiment and have a regimental commander. The written designation is easy to distinguish and commonly misused. A "forward slash" ("/") separates levels of command. 1st Squadron, 3rd Armored Cavalry Regiment is written 1/3 ACR whereas the 1st Battalion, 6th Field Artillery (again, Regiment is implied) is written 1–6 FA.
 Battalion (or cavalry squadron): Normally composed of three companies, troops or batteries and led by a battalion/squadron commander, usually a lieutenant colonel supported by a command sergeant major and a staff in a headquarters and headquarters company/battery/troop. 300–1,000 soldiers.
 Company (or artillery battery/cavalry troop): Designated A to C (plus HQ or support companies/batteries/troops) when in a 3 company/battery battalion or A to D when organized in a 4 company/battery battalion. Regimental troops are designated A to T, depending on the number of troops. The troops are then divided into their like squadrons. Each company/battery/troop is composed of a company/battery/troop headquarters and three platoons, and led by a company/battery/troop commander, usually a first lieutenant, captain or sometimes a major supported by a first sergeant. 62–190 soldiers.
 Platoon: Composed of a platoon headquarters and three squads, led by a platoon leader, usually a second lieutenant supported by a platoon sergeant (sergeant first class). 42 soldiers.
 Section: Usually directed by a sergeant supported by one or two corporals who supplies guidance for junior NCO squad leaders. Often used in conjunction with platoons at the company level. 12–24 soldiers.
 Squad:  Composed of two teams and is typically led by a staff sergeant or sergeant. 9 soldiers.
 Team: The smallest unit. A fire team consists of a team leader (usually a sergeant or corporal), a rifleman, a grenadier, and an automatic rifleman. A sniper team consists of a sniper who engages the enemy and a spotter who assists in targeting, team defense, and security. 4 soldiers.

Major Operational Units

Armies
First United States Army, US Army Forces Command
Third United States Army, US Army Central
Fifth United States Army, US Army North
Sixth United States Army, US Army South
Seventh United States Army, US Army Europe
Eighth United States Army, US Army Korea
Ninth United States Army, US Army Africa

Corps

 I Corps headquartered at Fort Lewis, Washington
 III Corps headquartered at Fort Hood, Texas
 V Corps headquartered at Fort Knox, Kentucky and in Poznan, Poland
 XVIII Airborne Corps headquartered at Fort Bragg, North Carolina

Divisions

Regular Army Divisions
 1st Armored Division
 1st Cavalry Division
 1st Infantry Division
 2nd Infantry Division
 3rd Infantry Division
 4th Infantry Division
 7th Infantry Division (Headquarters Only)
 10th Mountain Division
 11th Airborne Division
 25th Infantry Division
 82nd Airborne Division
 101st Airborne Division

Army National Guard Divisions
 28th Infantry Division
 29th Infantry Division
 34th Infantry Division
 35th Infantry Division
 36th Infantry Division
 38th Infantry Division
 40th Infantry Division
 42nd Infantry Division

Separate brigades/regiments
 2nd Cavalry Regiment (Stryker brigade combat team) at Vilseck, Germany
 3rd Cavalry Regiment (Stryker brigade combat team) at Fort Hood, Texas
 11th Armored Cavalry Regiment (multi-compo heavy brigade combat team) at Fort Irwin, California (Not in total below due to its non-deployable role as permanent OPFOR at NTC)
 75th Ranger Regiment (special operations airborne light infantry) HQ at Fort Benning, Georgia
 173rd Airborne Brigade Combat Team (infantry brigade combat team (airborne)) at Vicenza, Italy
 3rd Infantry Group at Fort Myer and Fort McNair, Virginia

US Army Combat Brigades after the current round of deactivations / re-organizations: 31
 10 Armored Brigade Combat Teams
 7 Stryker Brigade Combat Teams
 7 Infantry Brigade Combat Teams (light)
 4 Infantry Brigade Combat Teams (airborne)
 3 Infantry Brigade Combat Teams (air assault)

For 2020, the Army plans to convert one SBCT to a ABCT, and one IBCT to a SBCT, which would bring the totals to 11 ABCTs, 7 SBCTs, and 13 IBCTs.

Smaller units
Combat formations of the US Army at below brigade level include the United States Army Special Forces groups and several reserve separate battalions (100–442 Inf (USAR), 3-172 Inf (Mtn) (Vermont Army National Guard) etc.).

Branches and functional areas

Personnel in the Army work in various branches, which is their area of training or expertise. Traditionally, the branches were divided into three groups combat arms, combat support, and combat service support. Currently, the Army classifies its branches as maneuver, fires, and effects; operations support; and force sustainment.

Basic branches - contain groupings of military occupational specialties (MOS) in various functional categories, groups, and areas of the army in which officers are commissioned or appointed (in the case of warrant officers) and indicate an officer's broad specialty area.  (For example, Infantry, Signal Corps, and Adjutant General's Corps.) Generally, officers are assigned to sequential positions of increasing responsibility and authority within one of the three functional categories of the army branches (Maneuver, Fires and Effects; Operations Support; Force Sustainment) to develop their leadership and managerial skills to prepare them for higher levels of command. The branches themselves are administrative vice operational command structures that are primarily involved with training, doctrine, and manpower concerns. Each branch has a Branch Chief who is the Head of the Branch and usually serves as the respective branch school commandant or director.

Special branches - contain those groupings of military occupational specialties (MOS) of the army in which officers are commissioned or appointed after completing advanced training and education and/or receiving professional certification in one of the classic professions (i.e., theology, law, or medicine), or other associated health care areas (e.g., dentistry, veterinary medicine, pharmacy, registered nurse, physician's assistant). Officers of most special branches are restricted to command of units and activities of their respective department/branch only, regardless of rank or seniority. This means, for example, that Army Medical Department (AMEDD) branch officers may only command AMEDD units and activities.  Likewise, Chaplains are essentially "officers without command" and are ineligible to command operational units and activities. They do, however, supervise junior ranking chaplains and enlisted chaplain's assistants. As an exception to this general rule, JAG Corps officers are eligible to command and may be assigned (with permission from the Judge Advocate General) to non-legal command positions, although ordinarily, like other Special branch officers, a JAG officer will only lead JAG Corps units and activities during their career.

Basic branches and date established
Infantry, 14 June 1775
Adjutant General's Corps, 16 June 1775
Corps of Engineers, 16 June 1775
Finance Corps, 16 June 1775
Quartermaster Corps, 16 June 1775
Field Artillery, 17 November 1775
Armor, 12 June 1776
Ordnance Corps, 14 May 1812
Signal Corps, 21 June 1860
Chemical Corps, 28 June 1918
Military Police Corps, 26 September 1941
Transportation Corps, 31 July 1942
Military Intelligence Corps, 1 July 1962
Air Defense Artillery, 20 June 1968
Aviation, 12 April 1983
Special Forces, 9 April 1987
Acquisition Corps, 1 October 2002
Civil Affairs Corps, 17 August 1955 (special branch); 16 October 2006 (basic branch)
Psychological Operations, 16 October 2006
Logistics, 1 January 2008
Cyber Corps (As of 2014)

Special branches and date established

Army Medical Department, 27 July 1775:
Medical Corps, 27 July 1775
Nurse Corps, 2 February 1901
Dental Corps, 3 March 1911
Veterinary Corps, 3 June 1916
Army Medical Specialist Corps, 16 April 1947
Medical Service Corps, 30 June 1917
Chaplain Corps, 29 July 1775
Judge Advocate General's Corps, 29 July 1775

Special assignment "branches" insignia
Aides-de-Camp, 16 June 1775 (2nd Continental Congress authorized three military aides for the Commander in Chief) - officers only
Army Bands, 14 June 1775 (2nd Continental Congress authorized a musician in each Continental Army infantry company) - enlisted only (officers wear Adjutant General's Corps branch insignia)
Chaplain Candidates Corps, 18 June 2012 - officers only
Chaplain Assistant 28 December 1909 - enlisted only
General Staff Corps, 16 June 1775 (2nd Continental Congress authorized a general staff for the Continental Army) - officers only
Inspector General's Corps, 13 December 1777 (2nd Continental Congress appointed Major General Thomas Conway as first Inspector General of the Continental Army)
National Guard Bureau, 3 June 1916
Senior Enlisted Leader, 1 July 1975 - worn by command sergeants major and sergeants major when in a position rated by a general officer or senior executive service level civilian
Sergeant Major of the Army, 4 July 1966
Senior Enlisted Advisor to the Chairman of the Joint Chiefs of Staff, 20 December 2005
Staff Specialist Corps, 1 November 1941 - officers only

Each branch of the army has a different branch insignia. Per US Army Pamphlet 600-3, dated 1 February 2010, the three functional categories and associated functional groups for the branches and associated functional areas are:

Operations Division (OD) Branches and Functional Areas

Maneuver
Infantry, 14 June 1775
Ten companies of riflemen were authorized by a resolution of the Continental Congress on 14 June 1775. However, the oldest Regular Army infantry regiment, the 3rd Infantry Regiment, was constituted on 3 June 1784, as the First American Regiment.
Armor, 12 December 1776 
The Armor Branch traces its origin to the Cavalry.

A regiment of cavalry was authorized to be raised by the Continental Congress Resolve of 12 December 1776. Although mounted units were raised at various times after the Revolution, the first in continuous service was the United States Regiment of Dragoons, organized in 1833. The Tank Service was formed on 5 March 1918. The Armored Force was formed on 10 July 1940. Armor became a permanent branch of the army in 1950.
Aviation, 12 April 1983
Following the establishment of the U.S. Air Force as a separate service in 1947, the army began to develop further its own aviation assets (light planes and rotary wing aircraft) in support of ground operations. The Korean War gave this drive impetus, and the war in Vietnam saw its fruition, as army aviation units performed a variety of missions, including reconnaissance, transport, and fire support. After the war in Vietnam, the role of armed helicopters as tank destroyers received new emphasis. In recognition of the growing importance of aviation in army doctrine and operations, aviation became a separate branch on 12 April 1983.
Cyber Corps, 1 September 2014 (previously Signal Corps Information Systems Management)

Fires
Field Artillery, 17 November 1775
The Continental Congress unanimously elected Henry Knox "Colonel of the Regiment of Artillery" on 17 November 1775. The regiment formally entered service on 1 January 1776.
Air Defense Artillery, 20 June 1968

The Air Defense Artillery branch descended from the Anti-Aircraft Artillery (part of the U.S. Army Coast Artillery Corps) into a separate branch on 20 June 1968.

Maneuver Support
Corps of Engineers, 16 June 1775

Continental Congress authority for a "Chief Engineer for the Army" dates from 16 June 1775. A corps of engineers for the United States was authorized by the Congress on 11 March 1789. The Corps of Engineers as it is known today came into being on 16 March 1802, when the President was authorized to "organize and establish a Corps of Engineers ... that the said Corps ... shall be stationed at West Point in the State of New York and shall constitute a Military Academy." A Corps of Topographical Engineers, authorized on 4 July 1838, was merged with the Corps of Engineers in March 1863.
Chemical Corps, 28 June 1918

The Chemical Warfare Service was established on 28 June 1918, combining activities that until then had been dispersed among five separate agencies of government. It was made a permanent branch of the Regular Army by the National Defense Act of 1920. In 1945, it was re-designated the Chemical Corps.
Military Police Corps, 26 September 1941

A Provost Marshal General's Office and Corps of Military Police were established in 1941. Prior to that time, except during the Civil War and World War I, there was no regularly appointed Provost Marshal General or regularly constituted Military Police Corps, although a "Provost Marshal" can be found as early as January 1776, and a "Provost Corps" as early as 1778.

Special Operations Forces
Special Forces, 9 April 1987

The first special forces unit in the Army was formed on 11 June 1952, when the 10th Special Forces Group was activated at Fort Bragg, North Carolina. A major expansion of special forces occurred during the 1960s, with a total of eighteen groups organized in the Regular Army, Army Reserve, and Army National Guard. As a result of renewed emphasis on special operations in the 1980s, the Special Forces Branch was established as a basic branch of the army effective 9 April 1987, by General Order No. 35, 19 June 1987. Special forces are part of U.S. special operations forces

Psychological Operations, 16 October 2006

Established as a basic branch effective 16 October 2006 per General Order 30, 12 January 2007.

Civil Affairs Corps, 16 October 2006

The Civil Affairs/Military Government Branch in the Army Reserve Branch was established as a special branch on 17 August 1955. It was subsequently redesignated the Civil Affairs Branch on 2 October 1955, and it has continued its mission to provide guidance to commanders in a broad spectrum of activities ranging from host–guest relationships to the assumption of executive, legislative, and judicial processes in occupied or liberated areas. Became a basic branch effective 16 October 2006 per General Order 29, on 12 January 2007.

Effects
Public Affairs
Information Operations

Operations Support Division (OSD) Branches and Functional Areas

Network and Space Operations
Signal Corps, 21 June 1860

The Signal Corps was authorized as a separate branch of the army by act of Congress on 3 March 1863. However, the Signal Corps dates its existence from 21 June 1860, when Congress authorized the appointment of one signal officer in the army, and a War Department order carried the following assignment: "Signal Department – Assistant Surgeon Albert J. Myer to be Signal Officer, with the rank of Major, 27 June 1860, to fill an original vacancy."

Information Systems Management
Telecommunication Systems Engineer
Space Operations

Intelligence, Surveillance, and Reconnaissance (ISR) & Area Expertise
Military Intelligence Corps, 1 July 1962

Intelligence has been an essential element of army operations during war as well as during periods of peace. In the past, requirements were met by personnel from the Army Intelligence and Army Security Reserve branches, two-year obligated tour officers, one-tour levies on the various branches, and Regular Army officers in the specialization programs. To meet the army's increased requirement for national and tactical intelligence, an Intelligence and Security Branch was established effective 1 July 1962, by General Order No. 38, on 3 July 1962. On 1 July 1967, the branch was re-designated as Military Intelligence.

Strategic Intelligence
Foreign Area Officer (FAO)

Plans Development
Strategist
Nuclear and Counterproliferation

Forces Development
Force Management
Operations Research/Systems Analysis (ORSA)
Simulation Operations

Education and Training
Permanent Academy Professor

Force Sustainment Division (FSD) Branches and Functional Areas

Integrated Logistics Corps
Quartermaster Corps, 16 June 1775

The Quartermaster Corps, originally designated the Quartermaster Department, was established on 16 June 1775. While numerous additions, deletions, and changes of function have occurred, its basic supply and service support functions have continued in existence.

Ordnance Corps, 14 May 1812

The Ordnance Department was established by act of Congress on 14 May 1812. During the Revolutionary War, ordnance material was under supervision of the Board of War and Ordnance. Numerous shifts in duties and responsibilities have occurred in the Ordnance Corps since colonial times. It acquired its present designation in 1950. Ordnance soldiers and officers provide maintenance and ammunition support.

Transportation Corps, 31 July 1942

The history of the Transportation Corps starts with World War I. Prior to that time, transportation operations were chiefly the responsibility of the Quartermaster General. The Transportation Corps, essentially in its present form, was organized on 31 July 1942. The Transportation Corps is headquartered at Fort Lee, Virginia.

Logistics Corps, 1 January 2008

Established by General Order 6, 27 November 2007. Consists of multifunctional logistics officers in the rank of captain and above, drawn from the Ordnance, Quartermaster and Transportation Corps.

Soldier Support
Human Resources - Adjutant General's Corps, 16 June 1775

The post of Adjutant General was established 16 June 1775, and has been continuously in operation since that time. The Adjutant General's Department, by that name, was established by the act of 3 March 1812, and was re-designated the Adjutant General's Corps in 1950.
Financial Management - Finance Corps, 16 June 1775

The Finance Corps is the successor to the old Pay Department, which was created in June 1775. The Finance Department was created by law on 1 July 1920. It became the Finance Corps in 1950.

Acquisition Corps
Acquisition Corps

Special Branches
Army Medical Department (AMEDD), 27 July 1775

The Army Medical Department and the Medical Corps trace their origins to 27 July 1775, when the Continental Congress established the army hospital headed by a "Director General and Chief Physician." Congress provided a medical organization of the army only in time of war or emergency until 1818, which marked the inception of a permanent and continuous Medical Department. The Army Organization Act of 1950 renamed the Medical Department as the Army Medical Service. In June 1968, the Army Medical Service was re-designated the Army Medical Department. The Medical Department has the following branches:
Medical Corps, 27 July 1775
Army Nurse Corps, 2 February 1901
Dental Corps, 3 March 1911
Veterinary Corps, 3 June 1916
Medical Service Corps, 30 June 1917
Army Medical Specialist Corps, 16 April 1947

Chaplain Corps, 29 July 1775

The legal origin of the Chaplain Corps is found in a resolution of the Continental Congress, adopted 29 July 1775, which made provision for the pay of chaplains. The Office of the Chief of Chaplains was created by the National Defense Act of 1920.

Judge Advocate General's Corps, 29 July 1775

The Office of Judge Advocate General of the Army is deemed to have been created on 29 July 1775, the date of appointment of Colonel William Tudor as the first U.S. Army Judge Advocate General. The history of the branch has generally paralleled the origin and development of the American system of military justice. The Judge Advocate General Department, by that name, was established in 1884. Its present designation as a corps was enacted in 1948.

See also
Transformation of the United States Army

Notes

References

Military units and formations of the United States Army
United States Army organization
United States Army